Trey Chance Rutherford is a former professional gridiron football guard who played for two seasons with the Montreal Alouettes of the Canadian Football League. He played college football at Connecticut.

Professional career
On May 3, 2018, Rutherford was selected by the Montreal Alouettes with the second overall pick in the 2018 CFL Draft. Rutherford officially signed with the Alouettes on May 17, 2018. He played in 27 regular season games before announcing his retirement from professional football on January 20, 2021 to pursue a career as a police officer.

References

External links
Connecticut Huskies bio
Montreal Alouettes bio

1995 births
American football offensive tackles
UConn Huskies football players
Sportspeople from Markham, Ontario
Players of Canadian football from Ontario
Canadian players of American football
Living people
Canadian football offensive linemen
Montreal Alouettes players